Robert Bruce Tabb (August 10, 1833 - November 12, 1906) was a doctor and state legislator in Virginia. He represented Norfolk County, Virginia in the 1883-1884 session.

Biography 

He was born August 10, 1833 in Elizabeth City County, Virginia to John and Mary Anne Veale Tabb. His mother died October 21, 1842 and his father died December 85, 1860. He was of Caucasian descent.

He graduated with an M.D. from the University of Pennsylvania in 1855. He then started working as a doctor in Camden County, North Carolina

At the start of the American Civil War he enlisted with the Bourrough's cavalry battalion later joining the 15th Virginia Regiment and he was wounded and removed from active duty on November 10, 1862 but continued to serve as a doctor in the hospital.

He married Elizabeth Anne Warden April 25, 1861, who had been born in 1837 and died in 1891 and together they had several children.

After the war they moved to Norfolk County and he worked as both a doctor and a farmer.

He was elected to represent Norfolk County, Virginia as a Democrat in 1883 and served in the Virginia House of Delegates in the 1883-1884 session, serving on the Asylums and Prisons, Labor and the Poor and Retrenchment and the Economy committees.

Tabb was offered the nomination to serve in the house of delegates again for Norfolk county in 1887 but declined due to "the force of circumstances, unnecessary to mention".

He also served on the Norfolk County School Board and was an elections judge for Indian Creek, Norfolk County.

He died November 12, 1906 after suffering a long illness at the house of his daughter Mrs Charles A. Stewart in Falls Church, Virginia. He was buried at Oak Hill Cemetery.

References

1833 births
1906 deaths
People from Elizabeth City County, Virginia
Democratic Party members of the Virginia House of Delegates
Perelman School of Medicine at the University of Pennsylvania alumni
19th-century American physicians
19th-century American politicians
Physicians from North Carolina
People of Virginia in the American Civil War
People from Camden County, North Carolina
School board members in Virginia
Physicians from Virginia
Farmers from Virginia
People from Chesapeake, Virginia
People from Norfolk, Virginia